Prosotas is a genus of butterflies in the family Lycaenidae erected by Hamilton Herbert Druce in 1891. The species of this genus are found on New Guinea in the Australasian realm and the Indomalayan realm. An overview is provided by Hsu and Yen.

Species in alphabetical order:
Prosotas aluta (H. Druce, 1873) – banded lineblue
Prosotas atra Tite, 1963
Prosotas bhutea (de Nicéville, [1884]) – Bhutya lineblue
Prosotas datarica (Snellen, 1892)
Prosotas dilata (Evans, 1932)
Prosotas dubiosa (Semper, [1879]) – small purple lineblue, tailess lineblue
Prosotas ella Toxopeus, 1930
Prosotas elsa (Grose-Smith, 1895)
Prosotas felderi (Murray, 1874) – Felder's line blue
Prosotas gracilis (Röber, 1886)
Prosotas lutea (Martin, 1895)
Prosotas maputi (Semper, 1889)
Prosotas nelides (de Nicéville, 1895)
Prosotas nora (Felder, 1860) – common lineblue
Prosotas noreia (Felder, 1868) – white-tipped lineblue
Prosotas norina Toxopeus, 1929
Prosotas papuana Tite, 1963
Prosotas pia Toxopeus, 1929 – margined lineblue
Prosotas talesea Tite, 1963

References

External links

 With images.

Further reading
French Wikipedia has more information about this genus at :fr:Prosotas

 
Lycaenidae genera